The Paraguay women's national under-18 basketball team is a national basketball team of Paraguay, governed by the Confederación Paraguaya de Basquetbol.

It represents the country in international under-18 (under age 18) women's basketball competitions.

See also
Paraguay women's national basketball team
Paraguay women's national under-17 basketball team
Paraguay men's national under-18 basketball team

References

External links
 Archived records of Paraguay team participations

Basketball in Paraguay
Basketball teams in Paraguay
Women's national under-18 basketball teams
Basketball